União dos Palmares is a municipality located in the Brazilian state of Alagoas. Its population was 65,790 (2020) and its area is 428 km². Surrounding agricultural land is largely dedicated to sugar cane and cattle. At one time, when the city was an active rail stop with regular passenger service, it was named simply União due to its rail junction joining Alagoas and Pernambuco. The name was changed in 1944 to reflect its historic significance. The city is increasingly seeing domestic and foreign tourist drawn by historical and natural features that are now protected in Parque Nacional Serra da Barriga and Parque Memorial Quilombo dos Palmares.

History

The city of União dos Palmares has a historic importance to Afro-Brazilians. On a nearby hill was a mocambo or,  in more recent terms, a quilombo. These were centers of African slaves fleeing and resisting slavery. Known as the Quilombo dos Palmares this was the largest and most organized of the many quilombos in Brazil. The most famous figure of the Quilombo dos Palmares was  Zumbi dos Palmares. The quilombo reached a population somewhere around 30,000 composed of former slaves and some Amerindian allies. Between 1672 and 1696 it withstood repeated attacks by colonial forces until it fell to regular forces with artillery.

Present Day Relationship to History
The city is the gateway to the Parque Memorial Quilombo dos Palmares in the Parque Nacional Serra da Barriga and described as "A Terra da Liberdade" (A land of liberty). Memorial celebrations attract visitors and the park is a natural area preserving endangered Atlantic semi-deciduous forests of the Mata Atlântica. The park attracts visitors both domestic and foreign to tourist accommodations around the city. The park and city were given publicity by a 20 November 2003 ceremonial opening by the President of Brazil.

References

External links
Wikimapia: União dos Palmares
Parque Memorial Quilombo dos Palmares
Portal: União Notícia

Municipalities in Alagoas